Outlet Collection At Niagara is Canada's largest open-air outlet shopping mall and is located in Niagara-on-the-Lake, Ontario, Canada. It opened on May 15, 2014. 

Located only a 10-minute drive from Niagara Falls, 15 minutes from the US border and 90 minutes from the City of Toronto, the property is prominently situated along the QEW highway connecting the Greater Toronto Area and Niagara Falls.

The property features over 110+ fashion and lifestyle retailers, including Bass Pro Shops, Aritzia, Lululemon, Nike, Saks Off 5th, Coach, Under Armour, Marshalls, Michael Kors, Kate Spade and Moose Knuckles plus many more.

Outlet Collection at Niagara is a popular year-round destination, especially during the summer months where it hosts CURBSIDE, a vibrant outdoor food truck and culinary experience. The property is located in Niagara region, one of Canada's most scenic and frequented tourist destinations, known for being the epicenter of Canada's wine industry, as well as the home to Niagara Falls and dozens of popular tourist attractions, including those on Clifton Hill.

The region is also known for its world-class golf courses and dozens of festivals and annual events.

White Oaks Resort and Spa are adjacent to the property.

References

External links
 

Shopping malls in Ontario
Outlet malls in Canada
Ivanhoé Cambridge